Bechard or Béchard is a French surname. Notable people with the surname include:

 Albert Béchard (1922-2002), Canadian politician and notary
 Christine Béchard (born 1963), Mauritian athlete
 Claude Béchard (1969-2010), Canadian politician and Quebec provincial Cabinet minister.
 D. Y. Béchard, Canadian-American novelist
 François Béchard (1830-1897), Canadian politician
 Kelly Bechard (born 1978), Canadian ice-hockey player

French-language surnames